Paathi is a 2017 Malayalam language horror drama film produced by Gopakumar Kunhiveettil. The film is directed by  Chandran Narikode, and stars  Indrans and Joy Mathew in the lead roles along with Sasi Kallinga, Kalabhavan Shajon, Seema G. Nair, Santhosh Keezhattoor and Bindu Krishna. The music is composed by Ramesh Narayanan. The film is based on a story written by Vijesh Viswom.

Plot 
The film portrays the struggles faced by Kammaran, a practitioner at a local health centre and a theyyam face painter. Abortions that have been taken place in the centre haunt him as his inner feelings question him for not allowing those children to live their life. He tries to get away from those feelings by concentrating on his artistic side of being an Theyyam face painter. He also suffers from an ugly scar on his face which makes him very depressed in life. The film also has Othenan in his Theyyam attire advising his devotees in spite of himself being a failure in leading a good family life.

Cast 

Indrans as Kammaran
Joy Mathew   as   Othenan
Kalabhavan Shajohn   as   Kochu Moosa
 Sasi Kalinga   as   Muthoodan
 Santhosh Keezhattoor   as   Pavithran
 Valsala Menon   as   Muthassi
 Seema G. Nair  as   Radha
 Parvathi T   as   Kalyani
 Bindu Krishna   as  Ajitha
 Kanmani   as   Bushra
 C.V. Narayanan   as   Vasu
 Biju Chuzhali   as   Compounder

Soundtracks 
The music is composed by Ramesh Narayanan, and features singers Madhushree Narayan, Madhuvathi and Kavalam Sreekumar.

 "Cheri Thirinhu" – Kavalam Sreekumar
 "Mele"- Ramesh Narayan
 "Mizhineer" – Madhuvanthi Narayan
 "Teri Duniya"- Madhusree Narayan

References 

2017 films
2010s Malayalam-language films